Pterothecidae is an extinct family of Paleozoic molluscs of uncertain position, either Gastropoda or Monoplacophora, with isostrophically coiled shells.

Taxonomy 
The taxonomy of the Gastropoda by Bouchet & Rocroi, 2005 categorizes Pterothecidae in the superfamilia Bellerophontoidea within the 
Paleozoic molluscs of uncertain systematic position with isostrophically coiled shells (Gastropoda or Monoplacophora).

This family consists of the following subfamilies (according to the taxonomy of the Gastropoda by Bouchet & Rocroi, 2005):
 Pterothecinae P. Fischer, 1883
 Carinaropsinae Ulrich & Scofiled, 1897
 Pedasiolinae Wahlman, 1992

Genera 
Genera in the family Pterothecidae include:
 Pterotheca Salter, 1852 - type genus of the family Pterothecidae

References 

Prehistoric gastropods